The Kamov Ka-37 is an unmanned helicopter designed for aerial photography, television and radio broadcasting, delivery of medicines, food, mail, and emergency aid in disasters or hard and dangerous environments, and later several military roles. The aircraft uses coaxial rotors and a 45 kW engine. The operator may be located in a vehicle with monitors and flight controls, or with a simple hand-held radio controller.

Specifications

Engine power: 45 kW, (60 hp)
Max. take-off weight: 250 kg, (551 lb)
Economic cruising speed: 110 km/h, (68 mph) 
Hover ceiling: 2,500m, (1,553 ft) 
Range: 530 km, (329 mi)
Endurance: 45min
Payload: 50 kg, (110 lb)

References
 Bill Gunston "The Osprey Encyclopedia of Russian Aircraft", 2000
 Jane's Unmanned Aerial Vehicles and Targets

External links

 www.janes.com
 www.fsdome.com

1990s Soviet and Russian civil utility aircraft
Kamov aircraft
1990s Soviet and Russian helicopters
Coaxial rotor helicopters